Elna Faith Kakembo Wilén (born 16 April 1985) is a Swedish-Ugandan singer and nurse anesthetist.

Career
Kakembo started her musical career in a church choir when she was a teenager. She studied music at a folk high school for a year.

In 2019, Kakembo participated in music competition held by Sveriges Radio, P4 Nästa, with the song "Through Fire and Rain". In 2020, she participated in Melodifestivalen 2020 with the song "Crying Rivers", written by Swedish producer Jörgen Elofsson and Canadian songwriter Liz Rodrigues, where she placed fifth in the third semi-final.

In 2022, Kakembo participated in Melodifestivalen 2022 with the song "Freedom", co-written with Laurell Barker, Anderz Wrethov, and Palle Hammarlund. She qualified for the final and performed again on 12 March, finishing in 10th place with 51 points.

Discography

Singles

Notes

References

1985 births
Living people
Swedish women singers
Swedish gospel singers
Swedish soul singers
21st-century Swedish singers
Swedish people of Ugandan descent
People from Jönköping
Musicians from Kampala
Melodifestivalen contestants of 2022
Melodifestivalen contestants of 2020